Mount Engelstad is a rounded snow-covered summit rising from the edge of the Antarctic polar plateau at the head of Axel Heiberg Glacier, about midway between Helland-Hansen Shoulder and Mount Wilhelm Christophersen. It was discovered in 1911 by Roald Amundsen and named by him for Captain Ole Engelstad, of the Norwegian Navy, who had been selected as second in command of the Fram to carry the expedition to Antarctica, but who was killed in a scientific experiment preceding its departure.

References 

Mountains of the Ross Dependency
Amundsen Coast